Adaina bernardi is a moth of the family Pterophoridae. It is found in Costa Rica and Mexico.

The wingspan is about 15 mm. The head is scaled and brown, although it is cream while between the basal segments of the antennae. These are also cream white. The forewings are pale yellow-white with brown markings and grey fringes. The underside is brown. The hindwings are brown grey with grey fringes. The underside is brown.

Adults have been recorded in July, August and December.

Etymology
The species is named after Bernard Landry.

References

Moths described in 1992
Oidaematophorini